Elections for Walsall Council were held on Thursday, 3 May 2012. This was the same day as other 2012 United Kingdom local elections.  As the council is elected by thirds, one seat in each of the wards was up for election.

Election result

Council composition
The composition of the council before the election and a summary of which parties' seats are up for election can be found in the following table:

Ward Results
According to Walsall Council's website

References

Walsall
2012
2010s in the West Midlands (county)